San Román is a parish  in Amieva, a municipality within the province and autonomous community of Asturias, in northern Spain. 

The population is 17 (INE 2011). The postal code is 33558.

Villages
 La Llana
 San Román

Festivals
 San Román, 9 August

Parishes in Amieva